The Cathedral of Our Lady of the Immaculate Conception (in French language: Cathédrale de Notre-Dame-Immaculée), but sometimes called Saint Nicholas Cathedral (the name of the old church which was demolished in 1874), or Monaco Cathedral (French: Cathédrale de Monaco), is the cathedral of the Roman Catholic Archdiocese of Monaco in Monaco-Ville, Monaco, where many of the Grimaldis are buried, including Grace Kelly and Rainier III.

The cathedral was built from 1875 to 1903 and consecrated on 11 June 1911. It is on the site of the first parish church in Monaco, built in 1252 and dedicated to Saint Nicholas.  Of note are the retable (circa 1500) to the right of the transept, the Great Altar and the Episcopal throne in white Carrara marble.

Pontifical services take place on the major religious festivals, such as the Feast of Sainte Dévote (27 January) and the National Day of Monaco (19 November). On feast days and during religious music concerts, one can hear the four-manual organ, inaugurated in 1976.

From September through June, singers of the Cathedral Choir School perform during Mass every Sunday at 10:00am. Mass is also annually celebrated on Saint Nicholas Day on 6 December, when primary children gather for a remembrance of St. Nicholas' life.

References

External links

1875 establishments in Monaco
Monaco-Ville
Roman Catholic cathedrals in Monaco
Burial sites of European royal families
Burials at the Cathedral of Our Lady Immaculate